(The Wise Young Man and the Old Fool) is an opera by the French composer Étienne Méhul with a libretto by François-Benoît Hoffman. It takes the form of a comédie mêlée de musique (a type of opéra comique) in one act. It was first performed at the Théâtre Favart in Paris on 28 March 1793. A revised version appeared in 1801.

The opera was well received. A review in the Chronique de Paris of 1 April described the music as "by turns original, witty and romantic." According to David Cairns, this marks the first reference to Romanticism in music. The overture musically depicts the two main characters: unaccompanied flutes represent the wise young man and cellos, trombones and basses the old fool. Variations on these themes recur throughout the score.

Roles

Synopsis

Cliton is a 16-year-old obsessed with appearing wise. His father, Merval, is over 60 and a libertine, much to the embarrassment of his son. Cliton thinks marriage will make Merval more responsible and urges him to take the young and sensible Rose as his wife while Cliton himself plans to marry Rose's aunt, the prudish Élise. However, it emerges Rose is secretly in love with Cliton and Merval persuades his son to marry her instead while Merval will marry the aunt. After more comic confusion, Élise finally accepts this state of affairs.

Recordings
The overture appears on: Méhul Overtures, Orchestre de Bretagne, conducted by Stefan Sanderling (ASV, 2002) Catalogue number CD DCA 1140.

References

Sources
 Adélaïde de Place, Étienne Nicolas Méhul (Bleu Nuit Éditeur, 2005)
 Nicole Wild and David Charlton Théâtre de l'Opéra-Comique, Paris: Repertoire 1762–1972 (Éditions Mardaga, 2005)

Further reading
Printed score: Le Jeune sage et le Vieux fou – Comédie en un Acte en Prose Par Hoffmann, Représentée pour la premiere fois le jeudi 28 Mars 1793 sur le Théatre de l'Opéra Comique National de la Rue Favart cy-devant Comédie Italienne, Mise en Musique par Méhul, Paris, Huguet, s.d. (online, Gallica, Bibliothèque nationale de France)
1801 libretto: Le Jeune sage et le Vieux fou, Comédie en un Acte, En Prose et mêlée de Musique. Paroles du cit. Hoffman, Musique du cit. Méhul; Représentée pour la première fois, sur le Thêatre de l'Opéra-Comique le ... 1793., Paris, Huet, An X (1801–1802) (online, HathiTrust digital library)

Operas
One-act operas
Operas by Étienne Méhul
1793 operas
Opéras comiques
French-language operas